is a Japanese international school in Oberkassel, Düsseldorf, Germany.

Japanische Ergänzungsschule in Düsseldorf (デュッセルドルフ日本語補習校 Dyusserudorufu Nihongo Hoshūkō), a Japanese weekend school, is a part of the institution.

History
It first opened on April 21, 1971 in the Canisiushaus building of the St. Antonius Church in Oberkassel. It served 43 students in grades 5 through 9. In 1972 classes for grades 1-4 opened at the Don Bosco School in Oberkassel, with 90 students. That year, the Japanese Ministry of Education recognized the school as an international school.

In 1973 a dedicated school building, located in Oberkassel, opened. The growth of Japan's economy resulted in an expansion in the student body. Due to overcrowding, the junior high school moved to a satellite building in 1983. The Lanker School, a former public school building in Oberkassel, began serving the junior high students. In 1985 the school had 880 students ages 6 through 15.

As of 1985, as there were not yet any Japanese curriculum high schools in Europe, graduates typically went back to Japan to attend high school as they were not equipped enough in German to enter German upper secondary education systems. At that time the enrollment was 900.

The student population peaked in 1992. In 2001 the junior high school moved back to the main building.

Since the early 1980s and as of 2003 the school's secondary division has consistently had over 500 students.

As of 2016 the school had 356 students in elementary school, grades 1-6, and 108 students in junior high school, grades 7-9.

Curriculum
Because Japanese parents want their students to be prepared for higher education in Japan, most courses were taught in Japanese. As of 1985 students take German language lessons for two hours per week. Fukushima, an official of the school quoted in an Associated Press article, stated in 1985 that he wanted to organize inter-cultural activities such as stage plays and picnics and to increase instruction time of German classes to increase interaction between Japanese and Germans in the area.

Teachers
Each teacher comes from Japan to the school and teaches on a three year shift. As of 1985 the school had 30 teachers.

See also

 Japanese community of Düsseldorf
 Japan Day in Düsseldorf
German international schools in Japan:
German School Tokyo Yokohama - in Yokohama, Japan
Deutsche Schule Kobe/European School

References

Further reading
  Kakuichi, Nobuko (垣内 信子 Kakuichi Nobuko; 千葉大学教育学部). "Problems associated with the education of returnees from Japanese schools abroad : A case study of the Japanese school in Dussldorf" (日本人学校と帰国子女教育についての一考察 : デュッセルドルフ日本人学校の事例を通して). A bulletin of the Center for Educational Research and Training, the Faculty of Education, Chiba University (千葉大学教育実践研究). 8, 67-74, 2001-03. See profile at CiNii.
  Hirayama, Junzo (平山 順造 Hirayama Junzō; 前デュッセルドルフ日本人学校教諭・東京都目黒区立東根小学校教諭). "デュッセルドルフ日本人学校における国際理解教育 : 自己表現力とコミュニケーション能力の育成を目指して." 在外教育施設における指導実践記録 22, 67-70, 1999. Tokyo Gakugei University. See profile at CiNii.
  関岡 朋子. "Herzlich willkommen!--ようこそデュッセルドルフ日本人学校へ (図書館の話題a la carte)." The Library Journal (図書館雑誌) 99(7), 437-439, 2005-07. 日本図書館協会. See profile at CiNii.

External links

 Japanische Internationale Schule in Düsseldorf
  Japanische Internationale Schule in Düsseldorf
 
 

Düsseldorf
International schools in North Rhine–Westphalia
Schools in Düsseldorf
Educational institutions established in 1971
1971 establishments in West Germany
Japanese diaspora in Germany
Dusseldorf